X-No-Archive, also known colloquially as xna, is a newsgroup message header field used to prevent a Usenet message from being archived in various servers.

Origin
The need for X-No-Archive began when DejaNews debuted in 1995.  DejaNews was the first large-scale commercial attempt to archive the Usenet news feed, and several newsgroup participants were concerned about privacy rights and about the possibility that their messages could be re-posted through DejaNews in the future.  DejaNews addressed these concerns by announcing that it would not archive Usenet messages containing the X-No-Archive header field.

How it works
X-No-Archive was designed to follow the standard message header protocol, RFC 1036 and RFC 977, used in existing newsgroups.  In addition to the standard header fields used in all newsgroup messages (including Path:, From:, Subject:, and Date:), news reader software allows a user to add optional fields to a header. According to RFC 822, these additional fields are prefixed with the label X- so that they can be ignored by news servers and newsreaders.  The phrase "No Archive" was coined as a way to state "Do not archive this message," and the X- prefix was added to complete the term X-No-Archive.

The proper field to prevent a message from being archived is:   X-No-Archive: Yes (abbreviated as "XNAY").

Some software systems also do not archive if the first line in the body of the message contains this text. This is useful for those users who cannot change the header of messages they send out. If the X-No-Archive field is set to "No", or the field is absent, a Usenet archive will not recognize a prohibition on archiving the message.

Newsreader software programs
When DejaNews was purchased by Google, Google continued to honor the X-No-Archive directive.  Other newsgroup archiving services have also followed in DejaNews' footsteps, though the decision not to archive X-No-Archive messages has been entirely voluntary.

Many popular newsreader and posting software programs, such as Forté Agent, include, as a standard option, the ability to insert an X-No-Archive field into messages at the user's request.

Mozilla Thunderbird has the ability to insert custom fields into the header of both email and Usenet messages. This feature must be manually enabled by editing the mailnews.js file (instructions are included in the .js file). However, custom fields are not automatically inserted into messages by Thunderbird - the user must add them manually to each message as desired.

Mail Archive software
GNU Mailman supports XNA; archiving is suppressed for any value of X-No-Archive

Gmane  suppresses archiving for X-No-Archive: yes

The online service mail-archive.com supports X-No-Archive: yes

See also
Cancel message

References

External links
  Points out that—despite X-No-Archive—replies to your posts can quote you, and can mention your email address, and are archived by default.

Usenet
Email